The Women's time trial of the 2018 UCI Road World Championships was a cycling event that took place on 25 September 2018 in Innsbruck, Austria. It was the 25th edition of the event, for which Dutch rider Annemiek van Vleuten was the defending champion, having won in 2017. 52 riders from 34 nations entered the competition.

Van Vleuten became the first rider since Judith Arndt in 2012 to defend the world time trial title, finishing almost half a minute clear of her nearest rival. Just as she did in 2017, Anna van der Breggen won the silver medal, while a Dutch clean sweep of the podium placings was completed by the European champion, Ellen van Dijk, a further 56.2 seconds behind van der Breggen.

Qualification
All National Federations were allowed to enter four riders for the race, with a maximum of two riders to start. In addition to this number, the outgoing World Champion and the current continental champions were also able to take part.

Participating nations
52 cyclists from 34 nations took part in the women's time trial. The number of cyclists per nation is shown in parentheses.

Final classification
51 out of the race's 52 starters completed the -long course.

References

External links
 Individual time trial page at Innsbruck-Tirol 2018 website

Women's time trial
UCI Road World Championships – Women's time trial
2018 in women's road cycling
UCI